Pranab Kalita is a Bharatiya Janata Party politician from Assam.He has been elected in Assam Legislative Assembly election in 2016 from Palasbari constituency.

References 

Living people
Bharatiya Janata Party politicians from Assam
Assam MLAs 2016–2021
People from Morigaon district
Year of birth missing (living people)